, also known by his hero name , is a superhero and the main protagonist of the manga series My Hero Academia, created by Kōhei Horikoshi. In the series, he is an ambitious first-year high schooler and the 9th (and current) holder of "One For All" (ワン・フォー・オール, Wan Fō Ōru), a superpower which combines eight different individual superpowers, or "Quirks", together and creates powerful bursts of energy, and also has the unique ability to be passed off to other people.

Initially born without a "quirk" to call his own, Izuku nevertheless grew up with aspirations to become a superhero in his own right. Nicknamed "Deku" by childhood classmate and middle school bully - Katsuki Bakugo, Izuku would later save him from a villain, in turn winning over the interest of All Might, Izuku's childhood idol and #1 hero, who in turn passes down his sacred One For All quirk to him. After being accepted into U.A. High School, Izuku's classmate Ochaco Uraraka inspires him to embrace his nickname and use it as his hero name. 

In the anime adaptation of the manga, Izuku is voiced by Daiki Yamashita in Japanese and by Justin Briner in English. Izuku has received praise by critics for his character development and personality, and has also made consistent appearances in popularity polls related to the series.

Conception and creation

This prototype appears only in a 2008 one-shot comic written by Horikoshi called My Hero. He was later changed to a high-school student for My Hero Academia (with the chronic illness repurposed for All Might's character), however, his character remains largely unchanged. Horikoshi revised the design of Akatani's character, as he was especially dissatisfied with the hair and shortened it for Midoriya. Initially the protagonist was to remain Quirkless. Horikoshi changed the direction of Midoriya's character by adding his acquisition of One For All, due to suggestions from editors that argued that a powerless main protagonist would be overshadowed by other superpowered characters.

Voice actors
Izuku's Japanese voice actor, Daiki Yamashita, commented on how he played differently during the time Izuku has changed. He said that while he played the character as the series progresses, he tried to gain a strength for himself as well. And when he acted against the villains, he tried to not back down but to convey the mental strength in his acting as well. Yamashita also stated that during voice recordings he had to eat a lot to prepare due to how often the character screams.

English voice actor Justin Briner originally auditioned for other characters, who are mostly in Class 1-A, the same class as Izuku. When he saw the character, he felt that this gave him strength as a voice actor. He also stated that he didn't want to get his hopes up when he tried for the role. He described Izuku as "nerd" due to how relatable he is, and his sheer passion for heroism in the world that he lives in. Briner felt thankful that he lived for his character to voice throughout the series. He noted that voice acting had little nuances that he didn't expect.

Appearances
In My Hero Academia
Izuku is first seen in My Hero Academia as a 4-year-old boy about to be beaten up by three other classmates, one of them being Katsuki "Kacchan" Bakugo, who has the ability to create explosions. Izuku was born without any unique superpower, or "Quirk", to call his own unlike his parents and 80% of the world's population. Despite this setback, he grew up with aspirations to be a hero in his own right and began to idolize the superhero All Might. Izuku was raised primarily by his mother Inko, who has the ability to make small objects float towards herself. His father, Hisashi, whose quirk allows him to breathe fire, is not seen due to him working abroad in the United States. Throughout his childhood and into his teen years, Izuku would often be bullied by Katsuki, who would give him the nickname "Deku" (an alternate Kun'yomi reading of his given name's kanji that is homophonous with 木偶, meaning "useless person; good for nothing"; treated as a clipped compound of "Defenseless Izuku" in English translations) to mock his perceived worthlessness in superhero society.

Ten years later, Izuku has a chance encounter with Toshinori Yagi, otherwise known as All Might, and asks him if he too could be a hero, even though he possesses no Quirk. All Might, after he ends up revealing his true appearance, tells him in response to dream more realistically and to consider becoming a police officer. Later, when an unnamed villain with mud-like liquid abilities attacks Katsuki, Izuku without proper thought, runs up to try and save him, which in turn gives the worn-out All Might (who can only do hero work for a limited time a day due to a fight with All for One that destroyed half of his respiratory system) the motivation to finish off the villain.

Later, an impressed All Might meets up with Izuku and tells him that he wants him to inherit his quirk "One for All". Izuku accepts the offer and after ten months of training by All Might in order to prove his worth (in that time, Izuku turns 15), he is forced to eat a strand of hair from All Might in order to obtain One for All, just hours prior to the UA entrance exam. Izuku first uses One for All during the practical part of the exam to save fellow competitor Ochaco Uraraka from being squashed by falling rubble. In turn, she demands Izuku get some of her points for the practical, not knowing that by saving her, Izuku had passed the exam. In honor of his acceptance, his mother Inko fabricates him his very own super-suit, a teal-colored suit based on a sketch Izuku once drew. Izuku is placed in a class with Katsuki and Ochaco, the latter of whom inspires him to embrace "Deku" as his hero name due to sounding similar to "dekiru" (出来る), which roughly translates to "you can do it."

Throughout the course of the series, Izuku becomes an encouraging influence to his classmates, such as allowing class prodigy Shoto Todoroki to let go of traumas that prevented him from using his powers to its fullest potential, helping Ochaco Uraraka win the hero vs villain exercise, teaching Fumikage Tokoyami how to use his Quirk for defense purposes and helping Kyoka Jiro organize her notes for the school festival. After nearly a year of school activities and internships, some of which are intercepted by villain attacks, Izuku learns that All for One's apprentice Tomura Shigaraki has become powerful enough to steal One for All. Due to this, Izuku decides to leave U.A. so he can combat Shigaraki and his army of villains without endangering his classmates, who he had informed of his departure. Prior to leaving, he informs his classmates and several of the top heroes about One for All, the latter of whom assist him in hunting down the villains. His classmates tracked him down and were able to bring him back to U.A. successfully, while reminding him about how helpful he was to his class and why they see him as a friend even though he was born Quirkless, as well as Katsuki apologizing for his bullying attitude to Midoriya.

In other media
Izuku plays central roles in the movies My Hero Academia: Two Heroes, My Hero Academia: Heroes Rising and My Hero Academia: World Heroes' Mission. He also appears in the spinoff light novel series My Hero Academia: School Briefs, as well as the comic parody My Hero Academia: Smash!!, which depicts My Hero Academia's events in a more comedic manner.

Izuku appears as a playable character in the video games My Hero Academia: Battle for All, My Hero One's Justice, and My Hero One's Justice 2. He also appears as a playable character in the video game Jump Force along with All Might, Shoto Todoroki and Katsuki Bakugo. He'll also be appearing in a set event in Pixel Gun 3D, but is named "Quirky Boy", alongside two of his own weapons, the Double Quirk, and the Grenade Quirk.

Izuku also appears in Fortnite Battle Royale as one of the crossover characters along with Katsuki Bakugo, Ochaco Uraraka and All Might, for the launch of 'Chapter 4 Season 1'.

Powers and abilities
Izuku's quirk, One For All, can stockpile one's power, increasing the user's physical capabilities and being transferred from one person to another. Since this quirk can be passed down from user to user, the different quirks of the previous One For All holders also become embedded into One For All as well. These powers are:

 Gearshift, the quirk formerly held by the second user. This allows the user to shift the speed of himself, and anything he touches.
 Fa Jin, the quirk formerly held by the third user. This enables the user to build up and store kinetic energy as they move, this energy can then be released as an explosive burst of speed and power.
 Danger Sense, the quirk formerly held by Hikage Shinomori, the fourth user. This enables the user to detect nearby threats.
 Blackwhip, the quirk formerly held by Daigoro Banjo, the fifth user. This enables the user to use streams of black energy in order to grab objects and capture enemies.
 Smokescreen, the quirk formerly held by En, the sixth user. This enables the user to create thick clouds of smoke, hindering vision.
 Float, the quirk formerly held by Nana Shimura, the seventh user. This enables the user to levitate.

Reception

Popularity
Izuku's character has been popular among the fans of the series. In a 2018 My Hero Academia character popularity poll by Crunchyroll, Izuku tallied up in first place with 11,429 votes. In the yearly Japanese My Hero Academia popularity polls, Izuku commonly ranks second place behind Katsuki Bakugo, although he has placed first in the first ever poll with 2,314 votes, and third in the fourth poll with 8,301 tallied votes. In Tumblr's top anime and manga characters of 2020, Izuku ranked first. He was ranked sixth in the Best Male Character category at the 42nd Anime Grand Prix in 2020.Anime! Anime! did a poll where the readers voted for the most popular hero characters. Izuku ranked as the second-most popular hero character from 2021 to 2023. At the Crunchyroll Anime Awards, Izuku won the "Hero of the Year" category in 2017 and 2018. He also won the "Best Boy" category in 2019, and his fight against Overhaul won "Best Fight Scene" category in 2021.

Critical reception
Izuku's character has received positive reviews from critics. Nick Creamer of Anime News Network called Izuku a "very likeable character" and noting that "he's joined by a rich cast of teachers and classmates who all add their own personality(...)." Isaac Akers of The Fandom Post found that Izuku is vital when it comes to his personality with the combination of earnestness, kindness, and naivety. He also said that the character was impossible to dislike, and his high-energy spirit meshes well with the excited pitch of the series itself. Daniel Kurland from Den of Geek praised the character as empathetic and his origins. He also liked the character's encounter with All Might which shows how this unconventional relationship that formed between them. He also praised Briner's voice performance as the character.

Michelle Smith from Soliloquy in Blue also liked Izuku and noting that "he spent a lot of time analyzing how they handled situations, and he's good at coming up with strategies," which makes him smart. She also said that "he possesses all the idealistic qualities that a good shounen hero should have. He's always out to help people, even if they don't ask for it." While discussing his frequent appearances on My Hero Academia popularity polls, Nerissa Rupnarine of CBR wrote that Midoriya stands out on his own despite following some common shōnen tropes, adding that Izuku's character development "(...) is truly admirable and captivating to watch." In his review for the My Hero Academia: Heroes Rising movie, Teo Bugbee of The New York Times'' mentioned how Izuku's tenderness "[added] to the film's surprisingly emotional potency."

Notes

References

Anime and manga characters who can move at superhuman speeds
Anime and manga characters with superhuman strength
Child superheroes
Crunchyroll Anime Awards winners
Fictional characters with disfigurements
Fictional characters with post-traumatic stress disorder
Fictional characters with superhuman durability or invulnerability
Fictional Japanese people in anime and manga
Fighting game characters
Male characters in anime and manga
Comics characters introduced in 2014
Japanese superheroes
Male superheroes
My Hero Academia
Superheroes in anime and manga
Teenage characters in anime and manga
Teenage characters in television
Teenage superheroes
Superhero school students